Newtown Road is a Tide Light Rail station in Norfolk, Virginia. It opened in August 2011 and is situated on Curlew Drive at the city line between Norfolk and Virginia Beach. It is currently the eastern terminus of the line. The station is adjacent to the Interstate Corporate Center and the Sentara Leigh Hospital.

References

External links
 Newtown Road station

Tide Light Rail stations
Railway stations in the United States opened in 2011
2011 establishments in Virginia